The Podolian Upland (Podolian Plateau) or Podillia Upland (podilska vysochyna) is a highland area in southwestern Ukraine, on the left (northeast) bank of the Dniester River, with small portions in its western extent stretching into eastern Poland. 

The region lies roughly between the Southern Bug and Dniester Rivers, with the Western Bug also originating in the northwest of the highlands.

The surface is characterized by a combination of wide flat interfluves and deep canyon-like valleys (so called dales) dissected into separate natural sub-regions:
Wooded heightened hills
 Roztochia
 Holohory
 Voronyaky
 Kremenets Hills (Mountains)
 Tovtry
Flat treeless plateaus
 Ternopil Plateau
 Upper Bug Plateau
 North-Podolian Plateau

The Podolian Upland and the Volhynian Upland are sometimes grouped together as the Volhynian-Podolian Upland.

Gallery

See also
 Dniester Canyon
 Optymistychna Cave

External links
 Podolian Upland at the Encyclopedia of Ukraine.
 Herenchuk, K.I. Podolian Upland. Ukrainian Soviet Encyclopedia
 Shabliy, O.I., Mukha, B.P., Huryn, A.V., Zinkevych, M.V. Lviv Oblast relief. Podolian Upland (Рельєф Львівської області. Подільська височина). "Geography: Lviv Oblast".

Plateaus of Ukraine
Plateaus of Poland
Volhynian-Podolian Upland